John Ashley Rice (March 17, 1832August 18, 1906) was an American physician, Democratic politician, and Wisconsin pioneer.  He served six years in the Wisconsin State Senate, representing Waukesha County.  He was also a witness at the trial of Charles J. Guiteau for the assassination of U.S. President James A. Garfield.

Biography
Rice was born on March 17, 1832, in Ticonderoga, New York.  As a young man, he studied medicine with Dr. Harris, in Fleming County, Kentucky.  He then attended Western Reserve Medical College, of Hudson, Ohio, where he graduated in 1852.  That same year, he moved to the town of Merton, Wisconsin, in Waukesha County, where he started a medical practice.

Rice's medical practice flourished, and within a decade he was considered one of the foremost physicians in the state.  He also became active in politics as a member of the Democratic Party.  He was elected to three non-consecutive terms in the Wisconsin State Senate, representing Waukesha County in the 1870, 1871, 1874, 1875, 1878, and 1879 sessions.  He was the Democratic nominee for Lieutenant Governor of Wisconsin in the 1871 election, but was defeated by Milton Pettit.

In addition to his medical career, Rice became a celebrated archaeologist in his later years.  In the 1870s, he participated in an industrial expedition to Mexico and formed a friendly relationship with Mexican President Porfirio Díaz.  Díaz furnished him with a personal military guard which accompanied him around the country, visiting various sites of interest.  At the end of his side, he was inducted into the Sociedad Mexicana de Geografía y Estadística (Mexican Society for Geography and Statistics) the oldest such society in the Americas.

He received national notoriety when he testified as a defense witness at the trial of Charles J. Guiteau for the assassination of U.S. President James A. Garfield.  Guiteau's defense counsel was attempting to argue that he had been insane at the time of the murder.  Dr. Rice had examined Guiteau five years earlier—in 1876—to consider his sanity.  Rice pronounced him insane at that time, but Guiteau fled the county to avoid being committed to an institution.  In his testimony in 1881, Dr. Rice went on to explain the behaviors he observed in Guiteau that led to that insanity diagnosis, including religious delusions.

Rice died at his home on Lake Keesus in the town of Merton on August 18, 1906.

Personal life and family

Rice married Caroline Caswell in 1852. They had four children before her death in 1864.  Rice was survived by only one child, his daughter May.

Electoral history

Wisconsin Senate (1869)

| colspan="6" style="text-align:center;background-color: #e9e9e9;"| General Election, November 2, 1869

Wisconsin Lieutenant Governor (1871)

| colspan="6" style="text-align:center;background-color: #e9e9e9;"| General Election, November 7, 1871

Wisconsin Senate (1873)

| colspan="6" style="text-align:center;background-color: #e9e9e9;"| General Election, November 4, 1873

Wisconsin Senate (1877)

| colspan="6" style="text-align:center;background-color: #e9e9e9;"| General Election, November 4, 1877

References

1832 births
1906 deaths
People from Ticonderoga, New York
People from Merton, Wisconsin
School superintendents in Wisconsin
Democratic Party Wisconsin state senators
Physicians from Wisconsin
Case Western Reserve University School of Medicine alumni
Educators from New York (state)
Wisconsin pioneers